The Amazing Race 26 is the twenty-sixth season of the American reality television show The Amazing Race. In this season, eleven teams of dating couples (six existing couples and five blind date teams who met for the first time at the start of the race) competed in a race around the world. 

The season premiered on CBS with a special 90-minute episode on February 25, 2015, and the season finale aired on May 15, 2015.

All three of the final teams were couples matched up as blind dates at the start of the race. Laura Pierson and Tyler Adams were the winners of this season, while Jelani Roy and Jenny Wu finished in second place, and Hayley Keel and Blair Townsend finished in third.

Production

Development and filming

This season covered , five continents, and eight countries, including a first-time visit to Monaco. On some legs, teams could receive special Date Night rewards, which were inserted randomly in clue envelopes. These allowed the lucky team an opportunity to participate in a romantic activity during the pit stop.

For the second season in a row, four teams competed in the final leg. However, host Phil Keoghan eliminated one team in the middle of the final leg, leaving only three teams to race to the finish line.

Marketing
Travelocity and Ford continued their sponsorships with The Amazing Race. Fitbit became a new sponsor this season. Each team member received Fitbit devices, which were used in one of the tasks in Leg 10. This was also the last season to have Ford as a sponsor for the show.

Cast

The cast included a pair of dating Olympians: short-track speed skater Aly Dudek and bobsledder Steven Langton; as well as New Kids on the Block singer Jonathan Knight. 

At the pit stop of Leg 3, Matt Cucolo proposed to Ashley Gordon, who accepted.

Future appearances
In June 2015, Jackie Ibarra and Jeff Weldon were revealed as additional contestants on the seventeenth season of Big Brother by host Phil Keoghan.

Results
The following teams are listed with their placements in each leg. Placements are listed in finishing order. 
A  placement with a dagger indicates that the team was eliminated. 
An  placement with a double-dagger indicates that the team was the last to arrive at a pit stop in a non-elimination leg, and had to perform a Speed Bump task in the following leg. 
An italicized and underlined placement indicates that the team was the last to arrive at a pit stop, but there was no rest period at the pit stop and all teams were instructed to continue racing. There was no required Speed Bump task in the next leg.
 A  indicates that the team used an Express Pass on that leg to bypass one of their tasks.
 A  indicates that the team used the U-Turn and a  indicates the team on the receiving end of the U-Turn.

Notes

Race summary

Leg 1 (United States → Japan)

Episode 1: "Great Way to Start a Relationship" (February 25, 2015)
Prize: Express Pass (awarded to Jelani & Jenny)
Eliminated: Jeff & Lyda
Locations
Castaic, California (Castaic Lake) (Starting Line)
 Los Angeles → Tokyo, Japan
Tokyo (Chiyoda – Kanda Myojin)
Tokyo (Shinjuku – Shinjuku Central Park  Nakano – Nakanosakaue Chicken Tavern) 
Tokyo (Shinjuku – Wakaba Higashi Park) 
Tokyo (Chiyoda – Akihabara UDX Building) 
Episode summary
At Castaic Lake, six dating couples and five blind date couples, who met for the first time at the starting line, began the race. Teams had to complete a mud run obstacle course on the lake shore and grab a ring, which contained airplane tickets to their first destination: Tokyo, Japan. The first eight teams were booked on the first flight via EVA Air and the last three teams were booked on the second flight via China Airlines, which departed 45 minutes later. Once in Tokyo, teams had to make their way to Kanda Myojin, where they found their next clue.
 This season's first Detour was a choice between Syncing Steps or Samurai Sake. In Syncing Steps, teams had to travel to Shinjuku Central Park and learn a series of synchronized robotic dance moves with members of World Order in order to receive their next clue. In Samurai Sake, teams had to travel to Nakanosakaue Chicken Tavern, where they were shown ten bottles of sake. One team member had to take an order from a pair of samurai, while the other team member had to find the correct bottle from a large display. When the correct sake bottle was presented, teams made a toast with the samurai before receiving their next clue.
After completing the Detour, teams had to travel to Wakaba Higashi Park, where they were instructed to search in the vicinity of the Akihabara UDX building for a parking space in order to find the pit stop.
Additional notes
 This leg featured a Double U-Turn. Mike & Rochelle chose to use the U-Turn on Jeff & Lyda, while Jeff & Lyda chose to use the U-Turn on Jeff & Jackie. However, Jeff & Jackie had already passed the U-Turn by this point and were therefore unaffected.

Leg 2 (Japan)

Episode 2: "I Got the Smartest Dude" (February 27, 2015)
Prize: Fitbit watches and a fitness package for each team member, plus a personal chef, cooking lessons, and either a one-year gym membership or a year of fresh grocery delivery (awarded to Jelani & Jenny)
Date Night Reward: A trip to a Japanese hot spring (awarded to Harley & Jonathan)
Eliminated: Libby & C.J.
Locations
Tokyo (Chiyoda – Akihabara UDX Building) 
 Tokyo → Nagano
Nagano (Matsushiro Castle) 
Nagano (Nishi-guchi Zenkō-ji)
Nagano (Takesan Donabe Restaurant  M-Wave Olympic Arena) 
Nagano (Patio Daimon) 
Episode summary
At the beginning of this leg, teams had to ride a bullet train to Nagano and find Matsushiro Castle, where they found their next clue.
 In this season's first Roadblock, one team member had to solve a traditional puzzle box called a yosegi, which contained the password they needed in order to receive their next clue.
After completing the Roadblock, teams had to travel to Nishi-guchi Zenkō-ji in order to receive their next clue.
 This leg's Detour was a Blind Detour, where teams only learned about the task that they chose once they arrived at its location. It was a choice between Share or Chair. In Share, teams traveled to the Takesan Donabe Restaurant and had to feed each other a bowl of noodles, using only a pair of chopsticks while sitting in front of a large fan, in order to receive their next clue. In Chair, teams traveled to the M-Wave Olympic Arena. One team member had to sit on a chair mounted on a sled while their partner pushed the chair around a speed skating track, and they then switched places after one lap. Teams had to finish both laps within a combined time of 3:55 minutes in order to receive their next clue.
Teams had to check in at the pit stop: the Patio Daimon in Nagano.

Leg 3 (Japan → Thailand)

Episode 3: "#MurphysLaw" (March 6, 2015)
Prize: A trip for two to Prague, Czech Republic (awarded to Mike & Rochelle)
Date Night Reward: A romantic evening on the beach at the pit stop (awarded to Bergen & Kurt, who gifted it to Matt & Ashley)
Locations
Nagano (Patio Daimon) 
 Nagano → Tokyo
 Tokyo → Phuket, Thailand
Kathu (Patong Beach – Bangla Road)
Kathu (Patong Beach Bed and Breakfast)
Mueang Phuket (Baan Teelanka)
Kathu (Phuket Wake Park  Flying Hanuman) 
Kathu (Patong Beach – My Way Cabaret)
Mueang Phuket (Sri Panwa Phuket – Baba Nest Rooftop Bar) 
Episode summary
At the beginning of this leg, teams were instructed to return by train to Tokyo and then fly to Phuket, Thailand. Once in Phuket, teams had to travel to Bangla Road and search for a street hawker with selfie sticks. Each selfie stick had one of three departure times the next morning, when teams had to make their way to the Patong Beach Bed and Breakfast in Kathu, where they found their next clue. They were then directed to the Baan Teelanka (the "Upside Down House"), where teams had to search for their next clue hanging upside-down from a toilet.
 This leg's Detour was a choice between Ski or Tree. In Ski, teams traveled to Phuket Wake Park, where each member had to ride one lap of the wave pool on a wakeboard in order to receive their next clue. In Tree, teams traveled to Flying Hanuman, where they dressed as waiters and had to deliver a full meal intact to customers via zip-line in order to receive their next clue.
After completing the Detour, teams had to make their way to the At My Way Cabaret. There, they had to don showgirl costumes and then perform a dance before an audience to the satisfaction of the manager in order to receive their next clue, which directed them to the pit stop: the Baba Nest Rooftop Bar in Sri Panwa Phuket
Additional notes
This was a non-elimination leg.
Matt proposed to Ashley at the pit stop, and she accepted. Bergen & Kurt, who had won the Date Night Reward, gifted it to Matt & Ashley in congratulations.

Leg 4 (Thailand)

Episode 4: "The Great Amazing Nasty Race" (March 13, 2015)
Prize: A trip for two to Puerto Vallarta, Mexico (awarded to Bergen & Kurt)
Date Night Reward: A romantic evening on a water boat at Chao Phraya River (awarded to Laura & Tyler)
Eliminated: Harley & Jonathan
Locations
Mueang Phuket (Sri Panwa Phuket – Baba Nest Rooftop Bar) 
 Phuket → Bangkok
Bangkok (Wat Yan Nawa)
Bangkok (Wat Yan Nawa – Mekhala Pier) 
Bangkok (Snooker Club & Caturday Café  Wat Klang Food Market & Wat Paknam Bhasicharoen) 
Bangkok (Pathum Wan Siang Gong) 
Bangkok (Wat Ratchanatdaram – Maha Chetsadabodin Pavilion Court) 
Episode summary
At the beginning of this leg, teams were instructed to fly to Bangkok, Thailand. Once in Bangkok, teams had to make their way to Wat Yan Nawa in order to find their next clue.
 For their Speed Bump, Harley & Jonathan had to assemble a traditional Thai grasshopper made out of river reeds before they could continue racing.
 This leg's Detour was a choice between Wheel or Water. In Wheel, teams had to travel by tuk tuk to the Snooker Club. Once there, they had to play snooker until they sank a red ball. They then had to take a bottle of milk to the Caturday Café and feed the cats in order to receive their next clue. In Water, teams had to travel by water taxi to Wat Intharam Pier and then search for Wat Klang Food Market. There, each team member had to eat a thousand-year-old egg. They then received a metal placard sending them to the Wat Paknam Bhasicharoen temple, where they participated in a traditional Thai prayer before receiving their next clue.
 In this leg's Roadblock, one team member had to use power tools to remove the transmission from a faulty engine block. Inside the transmission was a screwdriver with the next clue tucked inside the handle. The clue was a piece of fabric with the inscription "Metal Castle", directing teams to the pit stop at Loha Prasat in Wat Ratchanatdaram.

Leg 5 (Thailand → Germany)

Episode 5: "Get in That Lederhosen, Baby" (April 3, 2015)
Prize: A 2015 Ford Focus for each racer (awarded to Aly & Steve)
Date Night Reward: A romantic evening at the Bavarian Public Observatory (awarded to Mike & Rochelle)
Eliminated: Bergen & Kurt
Locations
Bangkok (Wat Ratchanatdaram – Maha Chetsadabodin Pavilion Court) 
 Bangkok → Munich, Germany
Munich (Wies'n Tracht und Mehr)
Munich (St. Peter's Church)
Munich (Schlafwagenfabrik)
Schliersee (Lake Schliersee)
Fischbachau (Wolfsee Halle Restaurant)  Bayrischzell (Hasenöhrl-Hof) 
Schliersee (Markus Wasmeier Museum) 
Schliersee (Lake Spitzingsee) 
Episode summary
At the beginning of this leg, teams were instructed to fly to Munich, Germany. Once in Munich, teams had to travel by train to a clothing shop and don traditional German outfits (Lederhosen for men and a dirndl for women), which they had to wear for the duration of the leg.
Teams then had to make their way to St. Peter's Church, where they had to climb to the top of the Alter Peter Tower and search for one of eight marked vehicles below. They had to drive to the Schlafwagenfabrik and drive in reverse through a Winter Wonderland, using the car's rear-view camera to see four signposts. At the end of the course, they had to tell the princess their next destination (Schliersee) in order to receive their next clue. At Lake Schliersee, teams had to choose a marked boat and row to their next clue, which was attached on a buoy.
 This leg's Detour was a choice between Stein or Stack. In Stein, teams traveled to the Wolfsee Halle restaurant, where they had to carry twenty-two steins full of beer and carefully deliver them all at once while walking through a crowd in order to receive their next clue. In Stack, teams traveled to the grounds of Hasenöhrl-Hof and had to vertically stack fifteen empty beer crates in order to receive their next clue.
 In this leg's Roadblock, one team member had to learn a Bavarian love song and then serenade their partner with correct pronunciation and key while perched on a ladder in order to receive their next clue. If they sang incorrectly, a bucket of water was dumped on them and they had to start over.
Teams had to check in at the pit stop: Lake Spitzingsee.
Additional notes
Bergen & Kurt left their vehicle behind on their way to the Schlafwagenfabrik because they had difficulty driving it, and instead traveled by taxi. They were then issued a two-hour penalty upon arrival. Additionally, Bergen & Kurt had difficulty finding the Hasenöhrl-Hof and were waiting at the train station when they were instructed to stop racing. Phil came to the train station to inform them of their elimination after all of the other teams had checked in.

Leg 6 (Germany → France & Monaco)

Episode 6: "Smells Like a Million Bucks" (April 10, 2015)
Prize: A trip for two to Cape Town, South Africa (awarded to Hayley & Blair)
Date Night Reward: A romantic evening at a hotel on the French Riviera (awarded to Laura & Tyler)
Eliminated: Jeff & Jackie
Locations
Munich (Hotel Pullman) 
 Munich → Nice, France
Nice (Hotel Westminster)
 Nice → Fontvieille, Monaco
Monaco-Ville (St Martin Gardens, Chocolaterie de Monaco & Port Hercules) 
Monte Carlo (Casino de Monte Carlo)
Èze, France (Église Notre-Dame-de-l'Assomption d'Èze )  La Turbie, France (Tête de Chien) 
Saint-Jean-Cap-Ferrat (Plage de Passable) 
Episode summary
At the beginning of this leg, teams were instructed to fly to Nice, France. Once in Nice, teams had to travel to the Hotel Westminster, where they had to choose from a variety of formal outfits to wear for the rest of the leg. Once they were dressed and ready the following morning, they took a helicopter across the border to Monaco.
 In this leg's Roadblock, as an homage to Grace Kelly, one team member had to travel by foot and purchase a bouquet of roses at St Martin Gardens and a box of chocolates at the Chocolaterie de Monaco. They then delivered them to their partner waiting on a yacht at Port Hercules, at which point they could receive their next clue.
At the Casino de Monte Carlo, teams had to spin a roulette wheel to determine which Detour they had to do. 
 A black spin required the teams to do Win By a Nose, where teams had to make Fragonard Parfumeur's signature perfume and cologne by using twelve essences to match the original scents. When the perfumer confirmed that teams correctly recreated the scents, they received their next clue.
Teams had to check in at the pit stop: the Plage de Passable in Saint-Jean-Cap-Ferrat.

Leg 7 (France → Namibia)

Episode 7: "Back in Business" (April 17, 2015)
Prize: US$5000 each (awarded to Matt & Ashley)
Date Night Prize: Massages (awarded to Laura & Tyler)
Locations
Cap-d'Ail (Marina) 
 Nice → Windhoek, Namibia
 Windhoek → Omaruru (Erindi Private Game Reserve)
Omaruru (Erindi Private Game Reserve – San Village) 
Omaruru (Erindi Private Game Reserve – Ranger Headquarters) 
Usakos (Spitzkoppe) 
Episode summary
At the beginning of this leg, teams were instructed to fly to Windhoek, Namibia. Once in Windhoek, teams chose a bush plane pilot who flew them to the Erindi Private Game Reserve. There, teams had to drive themselves to a village, picking up a salt lick en route, in order to retrieve their next clue.
 In this leg's Roadblock, one team member had to work with bushmen to build a traditional hut in order to receive their next clue.
After completing the Roadblock, teams had to deliver their salt lick to the head ranger at the ranger headquarters in order to receive their next clue.
 This leg's Detour was a choice between Track or Pack. In Track, teams had to choose a truck and use a telemetric device to track down an elephant in order to receive their next clue. In Pack, teams worked as butchers and had to cut slices of wildebeest meat until they completely filled a bucket. Teams then boarded a truck and fed the meat to a pack of African wild dogs in order to receive their next clue.
After completing the Detour, teams drove themselves to the pit stop at the Spitzkoppe.
Additional notes
This was a non-elimination leg.

Leg 8 (Namibia)

Episode 8: "Moment of Truth" (April 17, 2015)
Prize: A trip for two to Queenstown, New Zealand (awarded to Laura & Tyler)
Eliminated: Aly & Steve
Locations
Usakos (Spitzkoppe) 
Swakopmund (Swakopmunder Buchhandlung)
Erongo Region (Dorob National Park – Ground Rush Adventures Skydiving Club)  
Erongo Region (Dorob National Park – Snake Bend Pan)  
Erongo Region (Moon Valley Landscape – Goanikontes Oasis) 
Episode summary
At the beginning of this leg, teams had to find the Swakopmunder Buchhandlung, a German-language bookstore in Swakopmund, where they had to pick up a copy of the Allgemeine Zeitung newspaper and find their next clue, which was written in German.
 In this leg's Roadblock, one team member had to watch a yellow supply case drop  from an airplane and retrieve it on foot. After locating the case, they had to walk to a hilltop, pick up a Travelocity Roaming Gnome, and then reunite with their partner at the starting point in order to open the case, which contained their next clue.
 For their Speed Bump, Aly & Steve had to properly assemble six toy airplanes from repurposed soda cans before they could continue racing.
 This leg's Detour was a choice between Work or Play. In Work, teams had to attach five tires to their vehicles and drive  over a bumpy dirt road to smooth the road to a foreman's satisfaction in order to receive their next clue. In Play, teams had to sand ski across a series of sand dunes and then slide on a sand board to the bottom of a dune in order to receive their next clue. 
After completing the Detour, teams had to find the Goanikontes Oasis in the Moon Valley Landscape. There, each team member had to pick one of four animals (a camel, donkey, oryx, or zebra) and lead it to the pit stop.
Additional notes
 This leg featured a Double U-Turn. Laura & Tyler chose to use the U-Turn on Aly & Steve, while Matt & Ashley chose to use the U-Turn on Jelani & Jenny.
Jelani & Jenny used their Express Pass to bypass the Detour on this leg. However, they still had to do one side of the Detour since they were U-Turned.

Leg 9 (Namibia → Netherlands)

Episode 9: "Can I Get a Hot Tub!" (April 24, 2015)
Prize: A trip for two to Seoul, South Korea (awarded to Laura & Tyler)
Locations
Erongo Region (Moon Valley Landscape – Goanikontes Oasis) 
 Windhoek → Amsterdam, Netherlands
Ouderkerk aan de Amstel (Jagershuis) 
 Amsterdam (Munttoren)
 Amsterdam (Reguliersgracht  Felix Meritis) 
 Amsterdam (Museumplein Ice Skating Rink) 
Episode summary
At the beginning of this leg, teams were instructed to fly to Amsterdam, Netherlands. Once in Amsterdam, teams had to travel to the Jagershuis in Ouderkerk aan de Amstel in order to receive their next clue.
 In this leg's Roadblock, one team member had to don a traditional Dutch costume and search among hundreds of klompen (traditional wooden shoes) for the one that exactly matched a display in order to receive their next clue.
After completing the Roadblock, teams had to ride bicycles along the Amstel River to the Munttoren in Amsterdam, where they found their next clue.
 This leg's Detour was a choice between Soak or Shuffle. In Soak, teams had to pilot an electric-powered hot tub through the city's canals while solving a rebus along the route. Once teams wrote down the right answer (Ice Skating Rink), they received their next clue. In Shuffle, teams had to play a traditional shuffleboard game called sjoelen and score 51 points in order to receive their next clue.
After completing the Detour, teams had to ride their bicycles to the pit stop: the ice skating rink at Museumplein.
Additional notes
This was a non-elimination leg.

Leg 10 (Netherlands → Peru)

Episode 10: "Fruits of Our Labor" (May 1, 2015)
Prize: A Fitbit package for each racer, a phone and laptop of the racer's choice, and either home gym equipment or a one-year gym membership (awarded to Hayley & Blair)
Date Night Prize: A romantic dinner (awarded to Jelani & Jenny)
Eliminated: Matt & Ashley
Locations
Amsterdam (Museumplein Ice Skating Rink) 
 Amsterdam → Trujillo, Peru
Trujillo (Plaza de Armas)
Trujillo (Plazuela de la Merced) 
Santo Domingo (Fundo San Fernando – Cuartel #1) 
Otuzco (Parque Ramón Castillo)
Otuzco (Mercado Central de Otuzco  Potato Field & Mercado Central de Otuzco) 
Otuzco (Plaza de Armas) 
Episode summary
At the beginning of this leg, teams were instructed to fly to Trujillo, Peru. Once in Trujillo, teams had to make their way to the Plaza de Armas, where they had to find a brass band master of ceremonies, who handed them their next clue. Teams that arrived at night received a departure time for the next day and could enjoy a fireworks festival called Festival de Fuerza.
At the Plazuela de la Merced, teams had to find their next clue at "a shine with the morning sun": a shoeshine stand.
 In this leg's Roadblock, one team member had to harvest a row of sugarcane using a machete in order to receive their next clue and a bundle of sugarcane.
 For their Speed Bump, Matt & Ashley had to use an old-fashioned typewriter to properly type out a llama loan application before they could continue racing.
After completing the Roadblock, teams had to travel to the Parque Ramón Castillo in Otuzco, where they gave their sugarcane from the Roadblock to a fitness expert. They then used a chalkboard to record the activity data (steps and calories) from their fitness watch and calculated the steps needed to work off the calories from the sugarcane juice. Lastly, they had to drink a glass of sugarcane juice in order to receive their next clue.
 This leg's Detour was a choice between Mamas or Papas. In Mamas, teams had to walk through the busy streets of Otuzco's marketplace and purchase the ingredients needed to prepare chicha, a Peruvian moonshine, and then deliver them to an elderly lady known as La Señora de La Chicha. She traded the ingredients for a glass of chicha, which teams had to drink before receiving their next clue. In Papas, teams traveled to a potato field and had to pack potatoes into bags. They then had to deliver the potatoes to a market and correctly arrange each type of potato in separate bins of a marked stall in order to receive their next clue. If the potatoes were incorrectly sorted, they were dumped onto the ground and teams had to start over.
After completing the Detour, teams had to walk to the pit stop: the Plaza de Armas, across from the Statue of the Virgen de La Puerta.
Additional notes
Teams were provided tickets for a flight to Trujillo, but were under no obligation to use them.

Leg 11 (Peru)

Episode 11: "In It to Win It" (May 8, 2015)
Prize: A trip for two to Goa, India (awarded to Hayley & Blair)
Locations
Otuzco (Plaza de Armas) 
Trujillo (Universidad Nacional de Trujillo)
Trujillo (Asociación de Criadores y Propietarios de Caballos de Paso  Chan Chan) 
Huanchaco (Avenida Ribera & Manco Capac)
Huanchaco (Beach) 
Huanchaco (Church of the Virgen del Socorro) 
Episode summary
At the start of this leg, teams returned to Trujillo and were instructed to search for "South America's largest mosaic." Once there, they had to find a payaso (a clown) with a magnifying glass and were taken to a specific section of the mosaic located outside of the Universidad Nacional de Trujillo, where they had to find a tiny route marker flag and exchange it with the clown for their next clue.
 This season's final Detour was a choice between Shake Your Hips or Make Some Bricks. In Shake Your Hips, teams had to perform the marinera dance in traditional costume to the satisfaction of a judge in order to receive their next clue. In Make Some Bricks, teams traveled to the Chan Chan ruins, where they had to make twelve wet bricks from mud and sand. Once all twelve bricks were completed to the foreman's specifications, they then used a wheelbarrow to transport twelve dry bricks to a worksite in order to receive their next clue.
After completing the Detour, teams had to travel to Huanchaco and find their next clue at the intersection of Avenida Ribera and Manco Capac.
 In this leg's Roadblock, both team members had to carry a caballito de totora to the beach on foot. Once there, the chosen team member had to paddle out to a buoy in order to retrieve their next clue.
After completing the Roadblock, teams were instructed to make their way on foot to the pit stop at the Church of the Virgen del Socorro in Huanchaco.
Additional notes
This leg did not end with an elimination; all teams were instead instructed to continue racing.

Leg 12 (Peru → United States)

Episode 12: "Monster Truck Heroes" (May 15, 2015)
Winners: Laura & Tyler
Second Place: Jelani & Jenny
Third Place: Hayley & Blair
Eliminated (at the episode's midpoint): Mike & Rochelle
Locations
 Trujillo → Dallas, Texas
Arlington (AT&T Stadium) 
Burleson (P2 Ranch) (Elimination Point)
Dallas (Reunion Tower) 
Dallas (Railroad Track Shed near Trinity River)
Dallas (Continental Avenue Bridge) 
Episode summary
At the beginning of this leg, teams were instructed to fly to Dallas, Texas. Once in Dallas, teams had to travel to the AT&T Stadium in Arlington, where they received their next clue.
 In this leg's first Roadblock, one team member had to don a Dallas Cowboys uniform and then get harnessed and pulled to the very top of the stadium, where they collected a football playbook. After returning to the ground, they had to catch a touchdown pass and score a field goal in order to receive their next clue.
After completing the first Roadblock, teams had to make their way to the P2 Ranch in Burleson. There, teams donned cowboy hats, shirts, and boots and worked with cowboys to herd at least six Texas Longhorn steers into a pen in order to receive their next clue. Mike & Rochelle were eliminated when they arrived at the ranch last and they did not complete this task.
 In this season's final Roadblock, the team member who did not perform the previous Roadblock had to rappel from the top of Reunion Tower and spot a row of yellow and red flags, which were near the Trinity River. There, teams had to drive a monster truck through a series of mud pits to reach their final memory challenge. For this task, team members had to work together to unlock a shed using a combination which corresponded to the leg numbers in which four places were visited during the season.
{|class="wikitable unsortable" style="text-align:center"
|-
! scope="col" | Place 
! scope="col" | Country
! scope="col" | Leg
|-
! scope="row" | Buchhandlung 
| Namibia
| 8
|-
! scope="row" | Baan Teelanka 
| Thailand
| 3
|-
! scope="row" | Munttoren 
| Netherlands
| 9
|-
! scope="row" | Kanda Myojin 
| Japan
| 1
|}
Once the shed was unlocked, they found enlarged prints of the selfies they had taken during the season and had to attach them to a large world map in chronological order in order to receive their final clue, which directed them to the finish line at the Continental Avenue Bridge.

Reception

Critical response
The Amazing Race 26 received mixed reviews. Daniel Fienberg of HitFix wrote that "'Amazing Race' tried to do something that 'Amazing Race' wasn't equipped to do this season and the experiment was an utter failure, but it speaks to the resiliency of the format that it didn't destroy the season entirely. I don't think this was a great season of 'The Amazing Race,' but whatever problems I had with the season were entirely about weakly integrated product placement, redundant challenges and problematic Race architecture that left too many Legs stagnant and unchanged from start to finish." Meredith Goodman of The Daily Northwestern was negative towards the blind date format calling it "the tackiest gimmick of all". Jodi Walker of Entertainment Weekly wrote that "this season has been a weird one, but it's certainly been interesting." Rob Moynihan of TV Insider wrote that the blind date "gamble paid off, with most of that season's memorable moments stemming from the contempt between blind dating medical professionals Hayley and Blair." Luke Gelineau of TV Equals wrote "I ended up liking this season a bit more than I thought I was going to." In 2016, this season was ranked 25th out of the first 27 seasons by the Rob Has a Podcast Amazing Race correspondents. Kareem Gantt of Screen Rant wrote that "it was a truly suspenseful race throughout the season, and the cast was thoroughly likable, so much so that you hated for any team to get bumped off of this season."

Ratings
U.S. Nielsen ratings

Canadian ratings
Canadian broadcaster CTV also airs The Amazing Race on Fridays. Episodes air at 8:00 p.m. Eastern and Central (9:00 p.m. Pacific, Mountain and Atlantic).

Canadian DVR ratings are included in Numeris' count.

References

External links

 26
Amazing Race 26, The
Television shows filmed in California
Television shows filmed in Japan
Television shows filmed in Thailand
Television shows filmed in Germany
Television shows filmed in France
Television shows filmed in Monaco
Television shows filmed in Namibia
Television shows filmed in the Netherlands
Television shows filmed in Peru
Television shows filmed in Texas